Haraincha हरैंचा is a town center under Kosi Haraicha Municipality in Morang District in the Kosi Zone of south-eastern Nepal. Earlier it was a village development committee and was merged into Koshi Haraicha Municipality in May 2014. At the time of the 1991 Nepal census it had a population of 5067 people living in 966 individual households. In Harincha, there are number of basic facilities are available like post office, police station, water station, primary health centre, mini sports stadium , two boarding school.

References

Sundar Haraicha Municipality